Amblyrhynchichthys truncatus is a species of cyprinid in the genus Amblyrhynchichthys, native to Southeast Asia. Males have a typical length of 30 cm, and a maximum length of 40 cm.

References

Cyprinidae
Fish of Asia